Doughboys in Ireland is a 1943 American musical war film directed by Lew Landers and starring Kenny Baker, Jeff Donnell and Lynn Merrick. The film offered an early role for future star Robert Mitchum, who appeared in many films that year. A group of American troops are stationed in Ireland, where they come into conflict with the locals.

Cast
 Kenny Baker as Danny O'Keefe  
 Jeff Donnell as Molly Callahan  
 Lynn Merrick as Gloria Gold  
 Robert Mitchum as Ernie Jones  
 George Tyne as Jimmy Martin  
 Harry Shannon as Michael Callahan  
 Dorothy Vaughan as Mrs. Callahan  
 Larry Thompson as Captain  
 Syd Saylor as Sergeant 
 Herbert Rawlinson as Larry Hunt 
 Neil Reagan as Medical Captain  
 The Jesters as Singing Group

References

Bibliography
 Biskupski, M.B.B. Hollywood's War with Poland, 1939-1945. University Press of Kentucky, 2011. 
 Krutnik, Frank. In a Lonely Street: Film Noir, Genre, Masculinity. Routledge, 2006.

External links

1943 films
American musical comedy films
American black-and-white films
1940s musical comedy films
Films directed by Lew Landers
Columbia Pictures films
Films scored by John Leipold
Films set in Ireland
World War II films made in wartime
1943 comedy films
1940s English-language films